Kingdom Come is the second studio album by Bryan & Katie Torwalt. Jesus Culture Music alongside Kingsway Music released the album on October 15, 2013. They worked with Jeremy Edwardson in the production of this album.

Critical reception

Writing a review for AllMusic, James Christopher Monger describes, "[Kingdom Come as an] evocative CCM folk-pop that pairs tight, gorgeous harmonies with engaging melodies... [that] doesn't disappoint". Lins Honeyman, giving the album an eight out of ten at Cross Rhythms, says, "[Kingdom Come] showcase not only the Torwalts' obvious songwriting skills and the innovative production skills of Jeremy Edwardson but also the wonderfully unique and mesmerizingly passionate vocal style of Katie which shimmers and shines throughout this release." Awarding the album five stars from Louder Than the Music, Jono Davies states, "this album was a more intimate sounding album compared to some Jesus Culture recordings."

Track listing

Personnel 
 Bryan Torwalt – lead vocals, backing vocals 
 Katie Torwalt – lead vocals, backing vocals 
 Ian McIntosh – keyboards 
 Jonathan Berlin – keyboards, acoustic guitars, electric guitars 
 Jeffrey Kunde – acoustic piano, acoustic guitars, electric guitars
 Tore Kulleseid – electric guitars
 Brandon Aaronson – bass
 Josh Fisher – drums 
 Lewis Patzner – cello 
 Anton Patzner – viola, violin, string arrangements 
 Janna Adams – backing vocals 
 Paul Arend – backing vocals 
 Jenna Bachman – backing vocals 
 Crystal Bjorkman – backing vocals 
 Jonathan Bjorkman – backing vocals
 Hannah McClure – backing vocals 
 Paul McClure – backing vocals 
 Hilary Moriarty – backing vocals 
 Skyler Smith – backing vocals 
 Kim Walker-Smith – backing vocals, lead vocals 
 Cody Williams – backing vocals
 Shannon Williams – backing vocals

Production 
 Banning Liebscher – executive producer 
 Jeremy Edwardson – producer, engineer 
 Jonathan Berlin – additional production 
 Jeremy SH Griffith – mixing 
 Drew Lavyne – mastering 
 Skyler Smith – photography 
 Skylauki Productions – design

Charts

References

2013 albums
Bryan & Katie Torwalt albums